Elisenda de Sant Climent (1220–1275), was a Catalan slave.

She was born to Guillem Ramon de Sant Climent and married a Catalan farmer on Mallorca; they belonged to the Catalan colonists on Mallorca after the island was conquered by Aragon in 1229. They had a daughter, Guillemona.

In 1238, during the conquest of Valencia, Elisenda and her family was captured by Islamic slave traders on a raid on Mallorca. She and her daughter were taken to a harem of the emir of the Hafsid dynasty in Tunis, Muhammad I al-Mustansir. Her daughter was made Muslim and took the name Rocaia, and became the influential favorite of the son of the emir, Miromomeli, which gave also her mother privileges.

Elisenda made contact with the Catalan merchant Arnau Solsona, to whom she delivered gifts from the palace of the emir, among them a relic: a piece of the cloth which she described as a bit of the bandage the Virgin Mary used when tending to the wounds of Jesus, which was placed in the Old Cathedral of Lleida, where it was long preserved, and the story of Elisenda told.

References
 «Diccionari Biogràfic de Dones: Elisenda de Sant Climent»
 Lladonosa, Josep (1967). Arnau Solsona, un mercader lleidatà a Tunis (1218-12979). Barcelona: Rafael Dalmau (Episodis de la Història, 97).

1220 births
1275 deaths
13th-century Catalan people
Arabian slaves and freedmen
Medieval slaves
Slavery in Tunisia
Hafsid dynasty
13th-century people of Ifriqiya